This is a partial chronological list of cases decided by the United States Supreme Court during the Rehnquist Court, the tenure of Chief Justice William Rehnquist from September 26, 1986, through September 3, 2005. The cases are listed chronologically based on the date that the Supreme Court decided the case.

References

External links
Booknotes interview with David Savage on Turning Right: The Making of the Rehnquist Supreme Court, June 28, 1992.

Rehnquist
List